The FIBT World Championships 1981 took place in Cortina d'Ampezzo, Italy for the seventh time, having hosted the event previously in 1937 (Two-man), 1939 (Four-man), 1950, 1954, 1960, and 1966. Following the death of West Germany's Toni Pensperger at the track in 1966, numerous safety improvements were done at the track which were satisfactory enough for the FIBT to allow the championships to be hosted. These improvements would not be enough as American bobsledder James Morgan was killed during the four-man event. The death of a stuntman on the track during the first day of filming of For Your Eyes Only, done a week after these championships led track officials to shorten the track to its current configuration. Cortina would not host another championship until 1989.

Two man bobsleigh

Four man bobsleigh
February 8, 1981

Medal table

References
2-Man bobsleigh World Champions
4-Man bobsleigh World Champions
Bunksplace.com article on the Morgan death during the 1981 FIBT World Championships in Cortina d'Ampezzo, Italy
For Your Eyes Only production notes featuring the Cortina track

1981
1981 in Italian sport
Sport in Cortina d'Ampezzo
1981 in bobsleigh
International sports competitions hosted by Italy
Bobsleigh in Italy